The 12th Parliament of Lower Canada was in session from January 8, 1825, to July 5, 1827. Elections to the Legislative Assembly in Lower Canada had been held in July 1824. All sessions were held at Quebec City.

References

External links 
  Assemblée nationale du Québec (French)
Journals of the House of Assembly of Lower Canada ..., John Neilson (1825)

Parliaments of Lower Canada
1825 establishments in Lower Canada
1827 disestablishments in Lower Canada